The lambda point is the temperature at which normal fluid helium (helium I) makes the transition to superfluid helium II (approximately 2.17 K at 1 atmosphere).

The point's name derives from the graph (pictured) that results from plotting the specific heat capacity as a function of temperature (for a given pressure in the above range, in the example shown, at 1 atmosphere), which resembles the Greek letter lambda . The specific heat capacity has a sharp peak as the temperature approaches the lambda point. The tip of the peak is so sharp that a critical exponent characterizing the divergence of the heat capacity can be measured precisely only in zero gravity, to provide a uniform density over a substantial volume of fluid.  Hence the heat capacity was measured within 2 nK below the transition in an experiment included in a Space Shuttle payload in 1992.

Although the heat capacity has a peak, it does not tend towards infinity (contrary to what the graph may suggest), but has finite limiting values when approaching the transition from above and below. Since this exponent is negative for the superfluid transition, specific heat remains finite.

See also 
 Lambda point refrigerator

References

External links 
 What is superfluidity?

Threshold temperatures
Superfluidity